Gillellus arenicola, the sandy stargazer, is a species of sand stargazer native to the Pacific coast of Central America from Baja California, Mexico, to Panama where it can be found on sandy substrates at depths of from .  It can reach a maximum length of  TL.

References

External links
 Photograph

arenicola
Fish described in 1890